The Men’s individual competition of the Beijing 2022 Olympics was held on 8 February, at the National Biathlon Centre, in the Zhangjiakou cluster of competition venues,  north of Beijing, at an elevation of . The event was won by Quentin Fillon Maillet of France, his first individual Olympic medal. Anton Smolski of Belarus won the silver medal. This was his first Olympic medal. The defending champion, Johannes Thingnes Bø of Norway, won bronze.

Summary
In addition to being the defending champion, Johannes Thingnes Bø won the 2018-19, 2019–20, and 2020–21 Biathlon World Cup seasons overall, but in the 2021–22 season before the Olympics was stood fifth overall and fourth in the individual ranking. The 2018 silver medalist, Jakov Fak, qualified for the Olympics, whereas the bronze medalist, Dominik Landertinger, retired from competitions. The overall leader of the 2021-22 Biathlon World Cup before the Olympics was Fillon Maillet, and the leader in the individual was Tarjei Bø.

Maxim Tsvetkov started first, and Johannes Thingnes Bø started second. He missed one more target than Tsvetkov but was faster, overtook him at the fourth shooting, and finished three seconds ahead, which eventually cost Tsvetkov a medal. Fillon Maillet, started eleventh, was even faster and finished first. Anton Smolski, who did not miss and had the starting number 28, became the surprising silver medalist.

Qualification

Results
The race was started at 16:30.

References

 Biathlon at the 2022 Winter Olympics
Men's biathlon at the 2022 Winter Olympics